The New Zealand national cricket team toured Pakistan in March to April 1965 and played a three-match Test series against the Pakistan national cricket team. Pakistan won the Test series 2–0. New Zealand were captained by John Reid and Pakistan by Hanif Mohammad.

Test series summary

First Test

Second Test

Third Test

References

External links

1965 in New Zealand cricket
1965 in Pakistani cricket
1965
International cricket competitions from 1960–61 to 1970
Pakistani cricket seasons from 1947–48 to 1969–70